The Left Hand or Left hand may refer to:

One of a pair of organs of the primate body, called hands, attached to the arms at the wrists
Left-handedness, a term referring to a person who primarily uses their left hand to accomplish tasks and activities
Left Hand (comics), a comic book character owned by Marvel Comics
Left Hand (Vampire Hunter D), a character from the Vampire Hunter D series of books, published in Japan
Left Hand (manga), a Japanese manga
Left Hand, West Virginia, a community in the United States
Left Hand Brewing Company, a brewery located in Longmont, Colorado
Left-hand path and right-hand path, terms describing the two different/opposing belief systems
Left hand screw thread, screws threaded in the opposite direction of the more common right hand threads
LeftHand StoreVirtual, Hewlett-Packard storage products for computing, see HP StorageWorks
"The Left Hand" (Dollhouse), a 2009 episode of the television series Dollhouse
 The Left Hand, a pen name used by Benjamin Franklin

See also
 The Left Hand of Darkness, a 1969 science fiction novel by U.S. writer Ursula K. Le Guin